Wolfenbüttel Wildcats Baskets was a German women's basketball club from Wolfenbüttel playing in the Bundesliga. It made four appearances in the Ronchetti Cup in the 1990s, and in 2012 it won the national championship for the first time. In June 2013 the club filed for bankruptcy after already having major financial problems during the 2012/2013 season. For the 2013/2014 season a new club/team with the name Wolfpack Wolfenbüttel was founded, it plays in the second-tier league in Germany.

Titles
 Damen-Basketball-Bundesliga (1)
 2012

2012-13 Roster
 (1.91)  Ieva Kulite
 (1.89)  Viktoria Vincze
 (1.88)  Mara Conley
 (1.87)  Suska Berger
 (1.83)  Charmaine Callahan
 (1.78)  Roli-Ann Hardin
 (1.78)  Samantha Whitcomb
 (1.73)  Corinna Poschel
 (1.72)  Sarah Morton
 (1.71)  Brianne O'Rourke
 (1.68)  Nina Hartwich
 (1.60)  Kristina Stapel
 (?.??)  Anna-Lena Sprenger

References

Women's basketball teams in Germany
Sport in Lower Saxony
Wolfenbüttel
Basketball teams established in 2013